Euna Kim (born October 27, 1994), is a Korean American retired singer and rapper, previously based in South Korea. She appeared as a contestant on the South Korean survival reality shows Superstar K 3 (2011), Unpretty Rapstar 3 (2016), and The Unit (2017).

Career 
Kim began her singing career in 2011 as a contestant on the television talent show Superstar K 3, after which she joined YG Entertainment. She was meant to debut as a member of a new girl group, but she left the label in 2013 before debuting.

Kim made her solo debut in 2014 with the single "Without You Now" featuring Yoon Mi-rae, Tiger JK, and Bizzy. In 2015, she joined the short-lived girl group The Ark, which later disbanding in 2016 after releasing one song.

In 2016, Kim participated in the rap competition show Unpretty Rapstar 3. Later that year, she signed with Maroo Entertainment. In 2017, she competed in the survival reality show The Unit, finishing in 10th place. In 2018, Kim and former The Ark member Jeon Min-ju formed the duo KHAN and released the single, "I'm Your Girl?".
The duo also participated in Season 1 of Vocal Play.

Although Maroo had quietly removed KHAN from the artist section on their official site in 2019, Kim  did not confirm the duo's disbandment until March 2020, in a response to a comment on her personal Instagram. In a 2021 interview, Kim revealed that KHAN was originally supposed to have had a comeback almost immediately following their debut in 2018. However, their comeback was continually pushed back due to various songwriters struggling to create a "hit song" that matched Maroo's vision for the group's comeback concept. These delays led to the group being put on an indefinite hiatus by the company - which ultimately led to their disbandment.

On May 24, 2021, Kim announced her retirement from the entertainment industry through her personal Instagram.

Personal life
After retiring from the entertainment industry, Kim has become a Christian missionary.

Relationship and marriage
On May 24, 2021, Kim posted on her personal Instagram that she has moved back permanently to the United States, is planning on getting married. She married her non-celebrity fiancé in November 2021.

Discography

Singles

Filmography

Reality show

References

External links 

1994 births
Living people
American women pop singers
American women rappers
American rappers of Asian descent
South Korean women singers
South Korean female idols
South Korean women rappers
Unpretty Rapstar contestants
Superstar K participants
21st-century American women